Angelicin synthase (CYP71AJ4 (gene)) is an enzyme with systematic name (+)-columbianetin,NADPH:oxygen oxidoreductase. This enzyme catalyses the following chemical reaction:

 (+)-columbianetin + NADPH + H+ + O2  angelicin + NADP+ + acetone + 2 H2O

Angelicin synthase is a P450 monooxygenase enzyme.

References

External links 
 

EC 1.14.13